Edith Mary Pargeter  (28 September 1913 – 14 October 1995), also known by her pen name Ellis Peters, was an English author of works in many categories, especially history and historical fiction, and was also honoured for her translations of Czech classics. She is probably best known for her murder mysteries, both historical and modern, and especially for her medieval detective series The Cadfael Chronicles.

Personal
Pargeter was born in the village of Horsehay (Shropshire, England), daughter of Edmund Valentine Pargeter (known as Ted) and his wife Edith nee Hordley. Her father was a clerk at the local Horsehay Company ironworks. She later moved with her parents to Dawley where she was educated at Dawley Church of England School and the old Coalbrookdale High School for Girls. She had Welsh ancestry, and many of her short stories and books (both fiction and non-fiction) are set in Wales and its borderlands, or have Welsh protagonists.

After leaving school she worked as a temporary labour exchange clerk, then as assistant at a chemists' shop in Dawley, during which time her first novel, Hortensius, Friend of Nero, was published in 1936. During World War II, she enlisted in the Women's Royal Naval Service (the "Wrens") in 1940. She worked in an administrative role as a teleprinter operator at Devonport, and then at the Western Approaches Headquarters at Derby House, Liverpool. She reached the rank of petty officer by 1 January 1944 when she was awarded the British Empire Medal (BEM) in the New Year Honours.

In 1947 Pargeter visited Czechoslovakia in a Workers' Educational Association party and became fascinated by the Czech language and culture. She became fluent in Czech and published award-winning translations of Czech poetry and prose into English. She was an active Labour Party supporter until, with her brother Ellis Pargeter (a local councillor in Dawley) she left the party in 1949 because they believed that it had deserted socialist principles.

Writing career
She devoted the rest of her life to writing, both nonfiction and well-researched fiction. She never attended university but became a self-taught scholar in areas that interested her, especially Shropshire and Wales. Birmingham University gave her an honorary master's degree. She never married, but did fall in love with a Czech man. She remained friends with him after he married another woman. She was pleased that she could support herself with her writing from the time after the Second World War until her death.

Pargeter wrote under a number of pseudonyms; it was under the name Ellis Peters that she wrote her later crime stories, especially the highly popular series of Brother Cadfael medieval mysteries, featuring a Benedictine monk at the Abbey in Shrewsbury. That pseudonym was drawn from the name of her brother, Ellis, and a version of the name of the daughter of friends, Petra. Many of the novels were made into films for television. Although she won her first award for a novel written in 1963, her greatest fame and sales came with the Cadfael Chronicles, which began in 1977. At the time of the 19th in the series of 20 novels, sales exceeded 6.5 million. The Cadfael Chronicles drew international attention to Shrewsbury and its history, and greatly increased tourism to the town. In an interview in 1993, she mentioned her own work before the Second World War as a chemist's assistant, where they prepared many of the compounds they sold. "We used to make bottled medicine that we compounded specially, with ingredients like gentian, rosemary, horehound. You never see that nowadays; those tinctures are never prescribed. They often had bitters of some sort in them, a taste I rather liked. Some of Cadfael’s prescriptions come out of those years."

Her Cadfael novels show great appreciation for the ideals of medieval Catholic Christianity, but also a recognition of its weaknesses, such as quarrels over the finer points of theology (The Heretic's Apprentice), and the desire of the church to own more and more land and wealth (Monk's Hood, Saint Peter's Fair, The Rose Rent).

Later life
In 1992 her mobility began to decline after a fall during a service being televised for Songs of Praise at Shrewsbury Abbey. She had a further fall in 1994 at home that led to the amputation of a leg at Princess Royal Hospital, Telford.

She died at her last home in Glendinning Way, Madeley, Shropshire, in October 1995 at the age of 82, having recently returned home from hospital following a stroke. On 14 September 1997, a new stained glass window depicting St Benedict was installed in Shrewsbury Abbey and was dedicated to the memory of Edith Pargeter, with funds raised by donations from admirers of the author.

Recognition
The Mystery Writers of America gave Pargeter their Edgar Award in 1963 for Death and the Joyful Woman. In 1980, the British Crime Writers Association awarded her the Silver Dagger for Monk's Hood. In 1993 she won the Cartier Diamond Dagger, an annual award given by the CWA to authors who have made an outstanding lifetime's contribution to the field of crime and mystery writing. Pargeter was appointed Officer of the Order of the British Empire (OBE) "for services to Literature" in the 1994 New Year Honours. To commemorate Pargeter's life and work, in 1999 the CWA established their Ellis Peters Historical Dagger award (later called the Ellis Peters Historical Award) for the best historical crime novel of the year.

Pargeter's Cadfael Chronicles are often credited for popularizing what would later become known as the historical mystery.

Bibliography

As Edith Pargeter

Jim Benison a.k.a. The Second World War Trilogy
 The Eighth Champion of Christendom (1945) 
 Reluctant Odyssey (1946) 
 Warfare Accomplished (1947)

The Heaven Tree Trilogy
 The Heaven Tree (1960)
 The Green Branch (1962) (1230 William De Braose, a Norman Marcher Lord was hanged for an affair with Joan, lady of Wales, the wife of Prince Llywelyn ab Iorwerth.)
 The Scarlet Seed (1963)

The Brothers of Gwynedd Quartet
Four novels about Llewelyn the Last:
 Sunrise in the West (1974)
 The Dragon at Noonday (1975)
 The Hounds of Sunset (1976)
 Afterglow and Nightfall (1977)

Other
 Hortensius, Friend of Nero (1936)
 Iron-Bound (1936)
 The City Lies Four-Square (1939)
 Ordinary People (1941) (a.k.a. People of My Own)
 She Goes to War (1942)
 The Fair Young Phoenix (1948)
 By Firelight (1948) (US title: By This Strange Fire)
 The Coast of Bohemia (1950) (non-fiction: an account of a journey in Czechoslovakia)
 Lost Children (1951)
 Tales of the Little Quarter (1951). Translation from Czech of the collection by Jan Neruda
 Most Loving Mere Folly (1953)
 The Rough Magic (1953)
 The Soldier at the Door (1954)
 A Means of Grace (1956)
 The Assize of the Dying (1958). 
'The Assize of the Dying'; and 'Aunt Helen' ('The Assize of the Dying' was filmed, as The Spaniard's Curse, also in 1958)
 Legends of Old Bohemia (1964). Translation from Czech of the book by Alois Jirásek
 The Lily Hand and other stories (1965): 1995); see pseudonym Ellis Peters (books) (chron.): 
'A Grain of Mustard Seed', 'Light-Boy', 'Grim Fairy Tale', 'Trump of Doom', 'The Man Who Met Himself', 'The Linnet in the Garden', 'How Beautiful is Youth', 'All Souls' Day', 'The Cradle', 'My Friend the Enemy', 'The Lily Hand, 'A Question of Faith', 'The Purple Children', 'I am a Seagull', 'Carnival Night', 'The Ultimate Romeo and Juliet'
 A Bloody Field by Shrewsbury (1972) (US title: The Bloody Field)
 The Marriage of Meggotta (1979) (about Margaret de Burgh, daughter of Hubert de Burgh, 2nd earl of Kent, who saved Prince Arthur the first time King John tried to have him killed)

Non-fiction
 How to destroy the human personality. Birmingham Daily Post, 28 August 1968. Translation of an article by Ivo Pondelicek

Short stories

Brambleridge Tales
Late Apple Harvest Everywoman's, October 1938
Poppy Juice Everywoman's, November 1938
Christmas Roses Everywoman's, December 1938
Under the Big Top Everywoman's, January 1939
Meet of the Clear Water Hunt Everywoman's, February 1939
Lambs in the Meadow Everywoman's, March 1939
April Foolishness Everywoman's, April 1939
Happy Ending Everywoman's, May 1939

Others
Mightiest in the Mightiest. Everywoman's, March 1936.
Ere I Forget Thee. Everywoman's, July 1936.
Coronation Stairs. Everywoman's, March 1937.
Santa Claus Would Understand. Everywoman's, December 1937.
Perfect Love. Twenty-Story Magazine, December 1937.
Wrong Turning. Everywoman's, April 1938.
Under the Big Top. Everywoman's, January 1939.
Forty-Eight Hours Leave. Everywoman's, December 1939.
The Duchess and the Doll. The Uncertain Element: An Anthology of Fantastic Conceptions, edited by Kay Dick, 1950.
A Girl of Indiscretion. John Bull, 19 October 1953.
Assize of the Dying. Sydney Daily Herald, serialised daily from 23 October to 11 December 1954; and, as The Assize of the Dying, serialised in Good Housekeeping, January to March 1955. Collected in The Assize of the Dying.
How Beautiful Is Youth. Australian Women's Weekly, 20 April 1955. Collected in The Lily Hand.
Dead Mountain Lion. Australian Women's Weekly, 4 April 1956. Collected in The Trinity Cat.
A Lift into Colmar. Australian Women's Weekly, 6, 13, 20 and 27 March 1957. Collected in The Trinity Cat.
Young Man with a Pram. Australian Women's Weekly, 2 October 1957. Collected in The Trinity Cat.
The Linnet in the Garden. Australian Women's Weekly, 12 February 1958. Collected in The Lily Hand.
A Question of Faith. Argosy, February 1958, as by Edith Pargeter. 
Aunt Helen. Australian Women's Weekly, 30 April and 7 May 1958. Collected in The Assize of the Dying and The Lily Hand.
The Purple Children. Australian Women's Weekly, 2 July 1958. Collected in The Lily Hand.
The Man Who Met Himself. Argosy, November 1958, as by Edith Pargeter. 
Change of Heart. Argosy, January 1959, as by Edith Pargeter. 
An Image of Grace. Australian Women's Weekly, 5 August 1959.
Chance Meeting. Australian Women's Weekly, 2 September 1959. Collected in The Lily Hand.
The Squared Circle. Australian Women's Weekly, 16 December 1959. Collected in The Lily Hand.
Hostile Witness. Australian Women's Weekly, 5 April 1961. Collected in The Trinity Cat.
The Cradle. Australian Women's Weekly, 20 December 1961. Collected in The Lily Hand.
Guide to Doom. This Week, 10 November 1963.
The Chestnut Calf. This Week, 29 December 1963.
O Gold, O Girl!. Argosy, 31 March 1965, as by Edith Pargeter. Collected in The Trinity Cat as 'The Golden Girl'.
With Regrets. This Week, 30 May 1965. Collected in The Trinity Cat.
A Grain of Mustard Seed. This Week, 30 June 1966. Collected in The Trinity Cat as 'The Mustard Seed'.
Maiden Garland. Winter's Crimes 1, 1969. Collected in The Trinity Cat.
The Trinity Cat. Winter's Crimes 8, 1976. Collected in The Trinity Cat.
Come to Dust. Winter's Crimes 16, 1984. Collected in The Trinity Cat.
Let Nothing You Dismay!. Winter's Crimes 21, 1989. Collected in The Trinity Cat.
The Frustration Dream. 2nd Culprit, 1993. Collected in The Trinity Cat.
The Man Who Held up the Roof. Collected in The Trinity Cat. Details of any earlier publication unknown.
At the House of the Gentle Wind. Collected in The Trinity Cat. Details of any earlier publication unknown.
Breathless Beauty. Collected in The Trinity Cat. Details of any earlier publication unknown.
A Present for Ivo. Collected in The Trinity Cat. Details of any earlier publication unknown.

As Ellis Peters

George Felse and Family
 Fallen into the Pit (1951) (originally published under her own name)
 Death and the Joyful Woman (1961) (Edgar Award for Best Novel, 1963)
 Flight of a Witch (1964)
 A Nice Derangement of Epitaphs (1965) (US title: Who Lies Here?). Serialised as The Sands Have a Secret. Woman's Realm from 5 September to 10 October 1964
 The Piper on the Mountain (1966)
 Black is the Colour of my True Love's Heart (1967). Serialised Australian Women's Weekly, 22 and 27 December 1967 
 The Grass-Widow's Tale (1968). Serialised Australian Women's Weekly, 29 May and 5 June 1968
 The House of Green Turf (1969). Serialised Australian Women's Weekly, 15, 22 and 29 January 1969
 Mourning Raga (1969)
 The Knocker on Death's Door (1970). Serialised Australian Women's Weekly, 12, 19 and 26 August 1970
 Death to the Landlords! (1972)
 City of Gold and Shadows (1973)
 Rainbow's End (1978)

Brother Cadfael

 A Morbid Taste for Bones (published in August 1977, set in 1137)
 One Corpse Too Many (July 1979, set in August 1138)
 Monk's Hood (August 1980, set in December 1138)
 Saint Peter's Fair (May 1981, set in July 1139)
 The Leper of Saint Giles (August 1981, set in October 1139)
 The Virgin in the Ice (April 1982, set in November 1139)
 The Sanctuary Sparrow (January 1983 set in the Spring of 1140)
 The Devil's Novice (August 1983, set in September 1140)
 Dead Man's Ransom (April 1984, set in February 1141)
 The Pilgrim of Hate (September 1984, set in May 1141)
 An Excellent Mystery (June 1985, set in August 1141)
 The Raven in the Foregate (February 1986, set in December 1141)
 The Rose Rent (October 1986, set in June 1142)
 The Hermit of Eyton Forest (June 1987, set in October 1142)
 The Confession of Brother Haluin (March 1988, set in December 1142)
 A Rare Benedictine: The Advent of Brother Cadfael (September 1988, set in 1120)
 The Heretic's Apprentice (February 1989, set in June 1143)
 The Potter's Field (September 1989, set in August 1143)
 The Summer of the Danes (April 1991, set in April 1144)
 The Holy Thief (August 1992, set in February 1145)
 Brother Cadfael's Penance (May 1994, set in November 1145)

Others
 Holiday With Violence (1952). First published under her own name.
 Death Mask (1959)
 The Will and the Deed (1960) (US title: Where There's a Will)
 Funeral of Figaro (1962)
 The Horn of Roland (1974)
 Never Pick Up Hitchhikers! (1976)
 Shropshire (non-fiction, with Roy Morgan) (1992) 
 Strongholds and Sanctuaries : The Borderland of England and Wales (non-fiction, with Roy Morgan) (1993) 
 The Trinity Cat and Other Mysteries (Crippen & Landru, 2006), short stories (Dead mountain lion, A lift into Colmar, At the house of the gentle wind, Breathless beauty, A present for Ivo, Guide to doom, The golden girl, Hostile witness, With regrets, Maiden Garland, The trinity cat, Come to dust, Let nothing you dismay!, The frustration dream, The man who held up the roof)

As John Redfern
The Victim Needs a Nurse (1940)

As Jolyon Carr

Novels
Murder in the Dispensary (1938)
Freedom for Two (1939)
Masters of the Parachute Mail (1940)
Death Comes by Post (1940)

Uncollected short stories
Come In - and Welcome. Everywoman's, January 1938

As Peter Benedict
Day Star (1937)

Notes

References

Further reading
Bray, Suzanne. 2017. "'Continually Walking a Tightrope': Edith Pargeter’s Literary Crusade for Czechoslovakia", Études britanniques contemporaines, 52. http://doi.org/10.4000/ebc.3638
Christian, Edwin Ernest. 1992. "The habit of detection : the medieval monk as detective in the novels of Ellis Peters". In 	Medievalism in England. p. 276-289. Ed. Workman, Leslie J. (Studies in Medievalism, 4). Cambridge; Rochester (NY): D. S. Brewer.
Feder, Sue. 1996. "Edith Pargeter 1913-1995 Ellis Peters: Beloved Creator of 'Brother Cadfael'". Armchair Detective: A Quarterly Journal Devoted to the Appreciation of Mystery, Detective, and Suspense Fiction , (29:1), 34–36. 
Fullbrook, Kate. 2004; 2015. Pargeter, Edith Mary [pseud. Ellis Peters]. In Oxford Dictionary of National Biography. https://doi.org/10.1093/ref:odnb/60439
Gaylord, Alan T. 2011. "O Rare Ellis Peters: Two Rules for Medieval Murder". In Fugelso, Karl (ed.), Defining Neomedievalism(s) II,p. 129-146. Cambridge, England: Brewer. (SiMStudies in Medievalism 20).
Howard, H. Wendell. 2008. "The World of Brother Cadfael." Logos: A Journal of Catholic Thought and Culture 11 (1):149-162. doi: 10.1353/log.2008.0005.
Jacobs, Lesley. 2007. "Idealized images of Wales in the fiction of Edith Pargeter/Ellis Peters". In Marshall, David W. (ed.). Mass market medieval: essays on the Middle Ages in popular culture.p. 90-101. Jefferson, NC; London: McFarland.
Kaler, Anne K., ed. 1998. Cordially Yours, Brother Cadfael. Bowling Green State University Popular Press.  
Lanone, Catherine. 2011. "From St Winifred's Translation to Medieval Whodunnit: Ellis Peters and the Cadfael Chronicles." Anglophonia: French Journal of English Studies, (29:), 267–275. (In special issue: "Echanges et transformations: Le Moyen Age, la Renaissance et leurs réécritures contemporaines/Exchanges and Transformations: The Middle Ages, the Renaissance and Contemporary Reworkings." French summary.)
Lewis, Margaret. 2003. Edith Pargeter: Ellis Peters. Rev.2d ed. Bridgend, Wales: Seren.  
Mylod, Carol Kennedy. 1996. Medievalism, moral vision, and detection in Ellis Peters's chronicles of Brother Cadfael. Thesis, Doctor of Arts, St. John's University (New York).
Reynolds, William. 2000. "Ellis Peters's Felse Series: The Road to Brother Cadfael, and More." Clues: A Journal of Detection, (21:2), 105–11.
Rielly, Edward J. 2013. Ellis Peters: Brother Cadfael. In The Detective as Historian: History and Art in Historical Crime Fiction. Eds. R. B.  Browne, Lawrence A., J. Kreiser and R. W. Winks. Madison: University of Wisconsin Press.
Songer, Marcia J. 2005. "The Ultimate Penance of Brother Cadfael." CLUES: A Journal of Detection 23.4 (Summer):  63-68
Spencer, William David.  1992. "Welsh Angel in Fallen England: Ellis Peters' Brother Cadfael." In Mysterium and Mystery: The Clerical Crime Novel, pp. 61–70. Carbondale: Southern Illinois University Press. Original edition, Th.D. Thesis, Boston University School of Theology, 1986.  
Wunderlich, Werner. 1995. "Monastic Thrillers: Detecting Postmodernity in the Middle Ages."  Comparative Literature Studies 32 (3):382-400.

External links
 Ellis Peters
 Edith Pargeter
 Ellis Peters Books 

  
 

1913 births
1995 deaths
20th-century English novelists
20th-century British translators
20th-century English women writers
British mystery writers
Cartier Diamond Dagger winners
Edgar Award winners
English amputees
English Anglicans
English crime fiction writers
English historical novelists
English mystery writers
English translators
English women novelists
Officers of the Order of the British Empire
Writers from Shropshire
People from Telford
Recipients of the British Empire Medal
Translators from Czech
Translators to English
Women historical novelists
Women mystery writers
Writers of historical fiction set in antiquity
Writers of historical fiction set in the Middle Ages
Writers of historical mysteries
English women non-fiction writers
Women's Royal Naval Service officers